Rookie of the Year is a 1993 American sports comedy film starring Thomas Ian Nicholas and Gary Busey as players for the Chicago Cubs of Major League Baseball. The cast also includes Albert Hall, Dan Hedaya, Eddie Bracken, Amy Morton, Bruce Altman, John Gegenhuber, Neil Flynn, Daniel Stern (who also directed in his feature film directorial debut), and John Candy in an uncredited role.

Plot
Henry Rowengartner, an unskilled Little Leaguer who dreams of playing in the major leagues, breaks his arm catching a fly ball. When the doctor removes the cast, he discovers Henry's tendons have healed "a little too tight", enabling Henry to throw a ball with incredible force.

At Wrigley Field during a Chicago Cubs game, Henry's friends get a home run ball hit by the visiting Montreal Expos. Desperate to save the club from declining attendance, general manager Larry Fisher looks to recruit Henry. For the remainder of the season, Henry juggles the culture shock of playing in the major leagues alongside one of his heroes, aging pitcher Chet (Rocket) Steadman, and socializing. Henry's mother, Mary, tries to keep him grounded while resisting attempts by her boyfriend, Jack, and Fisher to exploit him.

Henry's first game is a relief appearance against the New York Mets, where his first pitch gives up a home run to the Mets' arrogant slugger Heddo, and then hits a batter, throws a wild pitch, yet still manages to get his first save. Henry improves his control under Steadman's mentoring and records a second consecutive save against the San Francisco Giants, and his first MLB strikeout.

Continuing to impress, Henry bats for the first time in a road game against the Los Angeles Dodgers. He frustrates the pitcher with his small stature and tiny strike zone, to the point that he walks Henry on four straight high pitches. He further taunts the pitcher at first and second base, and the pitcher retaliates by hitting the next batter, Suarez, but Henry and Suarez manage to both score runs despite nearly passing each other on the base paths.

The Cubs are winning, and Henry is growing in pitching success and fame. His personal life becomes strained as his friends grow resentful, and Mary breaks up with Jack and throws him out of the house when he tricks her into signing a contract that will send Henry to the New York Yankees. Henry resolves the conflict with his friends, and team owner Bob Carson explains he never authorized a deal with the Yankees and wants to retain Henry. Disappointed that Henry will retire at the end of the season, Carson respects Henry's decision and demotes Fisher down to hot dog vendor after learning he tried to set up the deal.

On the last day of the season, the Cubs face the Mets again at Wrigley Field, with Steadman starting. If the Cubs triumph, they win the division and move on to the National League Championship Series. Steadman pitches his best game in years, but he injures his arm on the last pitch. The ball is hit to Steadman who cannot throw it to home plate because his arm is hurt. He runs home and dives to tag the runner out at home, keeping the Cubs in the lead. He turns the ball over to Henry, who easily strikes out the side in the seventh and eighth innings. At the top of the ninth, Henry slips on a baseball, reversing the effects of his first fall and reducing his arm strength to normal.

Henry frustrates the Cubs and their fans by intentionally walking the first batter. He explains to his teammates why he can no longer throw fastballs and sends them back to their positions with a plan. With their cooperation, Henry sneaks the ball to the first baseman Okie, who tags the runner out. Henry walks the next batter, with whom he trades insults. When the runner dares him to throw the ball high, Henry does so but stops as the runner takes off for second and is tagged out, setting up a final showdown with Heddo. Henry throws a changeup, which Heddo misses, and his next hit appears headed for the bleachers but is ruled a foul ball. Henry opens his glove to find not his father's name, but Mary's. In the stands, she signals him to throw a "floater". He does so and strikes out a shocked Heddo (who then throws a tantrum at home plate), winning the division title for the Cubs and heading to the National League Championship Series.

The next spring, Henry plays Little League again. Mary and Steadman, now a couple, are his team's coaches. After catching a potential home run ball that ensures his team's victory, Henry raises his fist to reveal a Cubs World Series championship ring, signifying his role in the Cubs' World Series victory.

Cast
Thomas Ian Nicholas as Henry Rowengartner
Gary Busey as Chet "Rocket" Steadman
Amy Morton as Mary Rowengartner
Patrick LaBrecque as George
Robert Hy Gorman as Clark
Bruce Altman as Jack Bradfield
Dan Hedaya as Larry "Fish" Fisher
Albert Hall as Sal Martinella
Eddie Bracken as Bob Carson
Daniel Stern as Phil Brickma
Tom Milanovich as Heddo
Neil Flynn as Stan Okie
W. Earl Brown as Billy Frick
Ian Gomez as Odd Bellman
Andy Berman as Ernie
Colombe Jacobsen as Becky Fraker
John Candy as Cliff Murdoch (uncredited)
Barry Bonds as himself
Bobby Bonilla as himself
Pedro Guerrero as himself

Filming locations
Filming took place on location at, among other venues, Wrigley Field (including in between games of a doubleheader on September 19, 1992, between the Cubs and the rival St. Louis Cardinals) and O'Hare Airport. However, the road game against the Dodgers was filmed at Comiskey Park.

Reception
The film has received a 35% approval rating on Rotten Tomatoes based on reviews from 20 critics, with an average rating of 4.90/10. The consensus reads, "Rookie of the Year gets some laughs from its novel premise, but a high strikeout rate on jokes and sentimental fouls keeps this comedy firmly in the minor leagues."

Roger Ebert awarded the film three out of four stars, writing in his review: 

Stephen Holden of The New York Times dismissed the film as "a lighter-than-air movie fantasy of major-league stardom" with a "paint-by-the-numbers plot", while Michael Wilmington of the Los Angeles Times opined, 

The film grossed $9.2 million on 1,460 screens on its opening weekend It dropped to seventh place the following week, and by its third weekend was in eighth place behind Poetic Justice and six other films. It grossed $53.6 million in the United States and Canada but performed poorly internationally, grossing only $2.9 million for a worldwide total of $56.5 million on a budget between $10–14 million.

Following the film's release, Nicholas threw out the first pitch at Cubs games and was invited to sing Take Me Out To The Ballgame multiple times during the customary 7th-inning stretch. During the 2015 National League Championship Series where the Cubs faced the Mets as they did in the movie, he attended Game 4 in a Rowengartner #1 jersey similar to what he wore during the film.

Following the Cubs' win over the Cleveland Indians in Game 7 of the 2016 World Series to win their first championship since 1908, Nicholas, in celebration, tweeted the final shot from the movie of Henry showing his Cubs World Series ring. Furthermore, director Daniel Stern briefly reprised his role of Brickma following the win.

References

External links

1993 films
1990s sports comedy films
American baseball films
American children's comedy films
American sports comedy films
Chicago Cubs
20th Century Fox films
Films scored by Bill Conti
Films about families
Films directed by Daniel Stern
Films set in Chicago
Sports in Chicago
1993 directorial debut films
1993 comedy films
1990s English-language films
1990s American films
Films about Major League Baseball